Carlos Mario Álvarez Morales (9 December 1967 – 17 January 2022) was a Colombian politician. A member of the Colombian Liberal Party, he served as mayor of Armenia from 2016 to 2018. Mario Álvarez died in Armenia, Colombia, on 17 January 2022, at the age of 54.

References

1967 births
2022 deaths
Colombian politicians
Colombian Liberal Party politicians
People from Armenia, Colombia